Neodillonia albisparsa is a species of beetle in the family Cerambycidae. It was described by Ernst Friedrich Germar in 1824. It is known from Argentina, Brazil, Paraguay and Uruguay.

References

Onciderini
Beetles described in 1824